Dia Evtimova was the defending champion, having won the previous event in 2011, but chose not to participate.

Tereza Mrdeža won the title, defeating Paula Ormaechea in the final, 2–6, 6–4, 7–5.

Seeds

Draw

Finals

Top half

Bottom half

References
Main Draw

Zagreb Ladies Open - Singles
Zagreb Ladies Open